Eugene Victor Flynn is a mathematician, and currently a professor of mathematics at the University of Oxford.

Biography
Flynn was born in Washington, D.C., the son of academic James Flynn who took up a position at the University of Otago. He first studied at the University of Otago, before taking a PhD at Trinity College, Cambridge, supervised by J. W. S. Cassels.  He then spent a year as an assistant professor at the University of Michigan, returning to Cambridge as a research fellow at Robinson College. He then moved to the University of Liverpool, including four years as head of the pure mathematics department there. In 2005 he left Liverpool to move to the University of Oxford; he took up a fellowship at New College in October 2005 and was appointed a university professor of mathematics in October 2006.

His fields of specialisation are the arithmetic of elliptic curves and algebraic geometry.

Family
Flynn's father, James Flynn, was primarily involved in the research of intelligence and is noteworthy for his work on the Flynn effect; he died in 2020. His sister, Natalie Flynn, is a clinical psychologist in Auckland, New Zealand.

References

External links

Home page

1962 births
Living people
20th-century British mathematicians
21st-century British mathematicians
Alumni of Trinity College, Cambridge
Fellows of Robinson College, Cambridge
University of Michigan faculty
Academics of the University of Liverpool
Fellows of New College, Oxford
Algebraic geometers
University of Otago alumni
Academics from Washington, D.C.
American emigrants to New Zealand
Naturalised citizens of New Zealand